Snel is a Dutch surname. Snel means "quick" in Dutch. The origin of the surname often was patronymic, as Snel and Snelle were short forms of the archaic Germanic given name Snellaard (which originally meant "lively and strong"). People with this surname include:

Han Snel (1925–1998), Dutch painter active in Indonesia
 (1793–1861), Belgian composer, conductor and violinist
Menno Snel (born 1970), Dutch D66 politician, Secretary of State for Finance 2017–
Mick Snel (born 1993), Dutch korfball player
Nikki Snel (born 1993), Belgian acrobatic gymnast
Rudolph Snel van Royen (1546–1613), Dutch linguist and mathematician known as Snellius, father of Willebrord
Willebrord Snel (1580–1626), Dutch astronomer and mathematician known as Snellius and, in England, as Snell
Snell's law, or the law of refraction, is named after him

See also
Snell (surname), English version of the surname
Schnell, German version of the surname
Snellen, Dutch surname with the same origin
SNEL (disambiguation)

References

Dutch-language surnames
Patronymic surnames